The Urfa man, also known as the Balıklıgöl statue, is an ancient human shaped statue found during excavations in Balıklıgöl near Urfa, in the geographical area of Upper Mesopotamia, in the southeast of modern Turkey. It is dated  to the period of the Pre-Pottery Neolithic, and is considered as "the oldest naturalistic life-sized sculpture of a human". It is considered as contemporaneous with the sites of Göbekli Tepe (Pre-Pottery Neolithic A/B) and Nevalı Çori (Pre-Pottery Neolithic B).

Discovery
The statue was found during construction work, and the exact location of the find has not been properly recorded, but it may have come from the nearby Pre-Pottery Neolithic A site of Urfa Yeni-Yol. This is not far from other known Pre-Pottery Neolithic A sites around Urfa: Göbekli Tepe (about 10 kilometers), Gürcütepe. It is reported that it was discovered in 1993 on Yeni Yol street in Balıklıgöl, at the same location where a Pre-Pottery Neolithic site was investigated from 1997.

The statue is nearly 1.90 meters tall. The eyes form deep holes, in which are set segments of black obsidian. It features a V-shaped collar or necklace. The hands are clasped in front, covering the genitals. The statue is thought to date to around 9.000 BC, and is often claimed to be the oldest known statue in the world.

Context
Before the Urfa Man, numerous small-sized statuettes are known from the Upper Paleolithic, such as the Löwenmensch figurine (c.40,000 BC), the Venus of Dolní Věstonice (c.30.000 BC), the Venus of Willendorf (c.25000 BC) or the realistic Venus of Brassempouy (c.25000 BC).

Slightly later than the Urfan Man, Pre-Pottery Neolithic C, anthropomorphic statues are known from the Levant, such as the 'Ain Ghazal Statues.

Details

See also

 Art of Mesopotamia
 Jericho Statue, from c. 9000 years ago, found in Tel Jericho
 'Ain Ghazal Statues

References

9th-millennium BC works
1993 archaeological discoveries
Sculpture of the Ancient Near East
Neolithic
Archaeology of the Near East
1993 in Turkey
Archaeological discoveries in Turkey
Şanlıurfa
Sculptures of men in Turkey
Pre-Pottery Neolithic A